Association Sportive de la Garde Nationale known as AS Garde Nationale is a Mauritanian football club based in Nouakchott.

History
The club was founded in Nouakchott. It was known on past under the name of ASC Garde Nationale (Association Sportive et Culturelle de la Garde Nationale).

Crest

Achievements
Mauritanean Premier League
Champion (7): 1976, 1977, 1978, 1979, 1984, 1994, 1998

Coupe du Président de la République
Winner (4): 1981, 1986, 1989, 2001

Performance in CAF competitions
African Cup of Champions Clubs: 5 appearances

1977 – First Round
1978 – Second Round
1979 – First Round

1980 – First Round
1985 – First Round

CAF Cup Winners' Cup: 1 appearance
1982 – Preliminary Round

Current Players

External links
Team profile – maurifoot.net
Team profile – MauritanieFootball.com

Football clubs in Mauritania
Military association football clubs